Laurentia inclarella is a species of snout moth. It was described by Émile Louis Ragonot in 1888. It is found on Java.

References

Moths described in 1888
Anerastiini
Taxa named by Émile Louis Ragonot